A Kensington Security Slot (also called a K-Slot or Kensington lock) is part of an anti-theft system designed in the mid 1980s and patented by Kryptonite in 1999–2000, assigned to Schlage in 2002, and since 2005 owned and marketed by Kensington Computer Products Group, a division of ACCO Brands.

Description

The system consists of a small, metal-reinforced hole found commonly on small or portable computers and electronics equipment such as laptops, computer monitors, desktop computers, gaming consoles, and video projectors, combined with a metal anchor attached to a rubberized metal cable secured with a key or combination lock. The end of the cable has a small loop that allows the cable to be looped around a permanent object, such as a heavy table or other similar equipment.

The hole is found in most laptops, although a lock for it is typically not included. Occasionally, the slot is located so that installing a lock will also prevent the removal of a valuable subcomponent, such as a rechargeable battery or a memory module. The Kensington slot may be marked with a small icon that looks like a padlock with a capital "K", or the slot may be unlabelled.

Security 

While Kensington locks can discourage quick grab-and-run, opportunistic thefts of equipment from public locations such as coffee shops or libraries, they are not designed to be impervious protection measures or intended to secure equipment in unattended locations, as they can be torn out of equipment, the cases of which are typically plastic or thin metal (albeit not without visibly damaging the equipment), and the cable can be cut with wire or bolt cutters. More simply, the non-locking, loop end of the cable is dependent upon the availability of a suitable anchoring point on a virtually immovable base object, or a thief may just shift that object, and then take the protected device with cable attached.

The lock mechanism is typically a tubular pin tumbler lock or, less frequently, a flat key lock or numeric combination lock with no key.

Alternatives 
Several manufacturers offer similar locking mechanisms that do not require a special lock hole. They attach to a popular port, such as the VGA or printer port, and have special screws to secure locks in place.

References

External links 

Locks (security device)
ACCO Brands